Arts Magazine was a prominent monthly magazine devoted to fine art. It was established in 1926 and last published in 1992.

History

Early years
Launched in 1926 and originally titled The Art Digest, it was printed semi-monthly from October to May and monthly from June to September. Its stated purpose was to provide complete coverage of arts exhibitions in America, collated from all relevant news sources.

Growth
Art Digest was later purchased by James N. Rosenberg and Jonathan Marshall (who would subsequently own and publish the Scottsdale Daily Progress newspaper). In 1954, the title was changed to Arts Digest; then, in 1955, the title was changed to ARTS. The word "Digest" was dropped (as explained by Marshall in the September 15, 1955 issue) due to newer features, design modernization, and a widening audience. "We realized that there was a great need in this country for a serious art magazine to serve the growing public," the announcement stated. "Perhaps," he continued, "the best description of our editorial aims in the new ARTS can be found in the words interesting, unbiased, and authoritative."  Contributors to that issue included J.P. Hodin, Martica Sawin, Robert Rosenblum, Ada Louise Huxtable, and Dore Ashton, whose article "What is 'avant-garde'?" was the feature essay.

After Marshall and Rosenberg sold it in 1958, the publication was finally named Arts Magazine in 1961. Regular contributors at the time included Donald Judd, Helen De Mott, Sidney Tillim, Annette Michelson, Michael Fried, Lawrence Alloway, Jan Butterfield, and April Kingsley.

The magazine's offices were in New York City and it was last published by Art Digest, Co. The magazine was glossy and priced at $4.00 a copy in 1981. The April 1981 issue (see photo) had a cover story called "Gertrude Greene: Constructions of the 1930s and 1940s", written by Jacqueline Moss.

Closure

The last issue to reach subscribers was March 1992, featuring Alexandra Anderson-Spivy on artist Rackstraw Downes and Annie Sprinkle on Jeff Koons. The April issue was published but never mailed. Editors at the time included Dore Ashton, Jerry Saltz, Barry Schwabsky, Bill Jones, Jeremy Gilbert-Rolfe, Peter Selz, John Yau, Elizabeth Frank, and Jeanne Siegel.

Revival

As of 2020, the magazine is in the process of a revival. A new team of writers from leading media publications (e.g. The New York Times) and universities (Vanderbilt, New York University) has been assembled and website in developed and prepared for the official launch.

References

External links 
 Article about Louise Nevelson from Art Digest, November 15, 1943. Louise Nevelson papers. Archives of American Art. Retrieved November 6, 2011.

Visual arts magazines published in the United States
Monthly magazines published in the United States
Defunct magazines published in the United States
Magazines established in 1926
Magazines disestablished in 1992
Magazines published in New York City